Charles Brereton (10 December 1838 – 9 September 1898) was an English cricketer. He played five first-class matches for Cambridge University Cricket Club in 1858.

See also
 List of Cambridge University Cricket Club players

References

External links
 

1838 births
1898 deaths
English cricketers
Cambridge University cricketers
Cambridge Town Club cricketers
People educated at Marlborough College
Alumni of St John's College, Cambridge